"The Daring Young Man on the Flying Trapeze", originally published under the title "The Flying Trapeze" and also known as "The Man on the Flying Trapeze", is a  19th-century popular song about a flying trapeze circus performer, Jules Léotard.  The refrain states:

He'd fly through the air with the greatest of ease,
That daring young man on the flying trapeze.

The song was first published in 1867, with words written by the British lyricist and singer George Leybourne, music by Gaston Lyle, and arrangement by Alfred Lee.  The lyrics were based on the phenomenal success of trapeze artist Jules Léotard, for whom the one-piece dancer's garment was named.

The following century, the song inspired the 1934 short story The Daring Young Man on the Flying Trapeze by William Saroyan.  The film Man on the Flying Trapeze came out in 1935, starring W. C. Fields and Mary Brian.

This song is sometimes associated with Emmett Kelly, who performed as a trapeze artist before becoming famous as a clown.

Recordings
Harry McClintock recorded this song for Victor Records in 1928. Comedian Walter O'Keefe recorded the song in 1932, but owing to poor depression-era record sales, it took two years to become a hit. It was his theme song whenever he appeared on radio or television. It was later recorded by Don Redman & His Orchestra (1936), Eddie Cantor, Burl Ives, Cliff "Ukulele Ike" Edwards, Spike Jones, Ian Whitcomb, Les Paul & Mary Ford, Bing Crosby (for his 1962 album On the Happy Side), Alvin and the Chipmunks, Crispin Hellion Glover, Graham Parker, and Bruce Springsteen, among others. It also appeared (as "Flying Beat") on the MGM album The Beatles with Tony Sheridan & Guests, performed by The Titans. In 1994, the people at Disney wrote their own lyrics of this song for the Mickey's Fun Songs home video: "Let's Go to the Circus". JibJab also used this song to reflect the events that occurred in the year 2010, dubbed as "So Long To Ya, 2010".

Cinema
A version preceding the Fields film was performed by the Our Gang (Little Rascals) kids as the International Silver String Submarine Band in the 1934 short film Mike Fright. A second Our Gang rendition, by Carl "Alfalfa" Switzer, was later included in the 1939 short Clown Princes.

The passengers on the bus sing the song in the 1934 Frank Capra film It Happened One Night.

The song was the basis of the 1934 Popeye the Sailor musical cartoon The Man on the Flying Trapeze.

In the 1934 Fox film George White's Scandals, the song is performed by Rudy Vallee.

Dick Powell sings it twice in the 1934 film Twenty Million Sweethearts.

In the 1936 film Bengal Tiger, a group of the circus performers sing the song together in a bar after a performance.

In the 1952 film Phone Call from a Stranger, a group of passengers on an airplane sing the song together during turbulence.

In the 1954 film The Bridges at Toko-Ri the USS Savo Island band plays the refrain while Mickey Rooney's character (CPO Mike Forney) is being transferred via highline to a ship alongside.

A brief variation of this song with altered lyrics is sung by Alan Tracy and Tin-Tin Kyrano in the 1968 film Thunderbird 6, based on Gerry Anderson's popular television series, Thunderbirds.

The song was performed by young children in the Technicolor 1934 Vitaphone short Show Kids, written by Joe Traub and  directed by Ralph Staub.

In the 1997 film George of the Jungle the song plays as the title character swings on jungle vines.

There is also a short sequence in the 2013 film The Lone Ranger, where the song is played as background music when the heroes of the movie go to a traveling carnival with a brothel.

The song was featured in The Cuphead Show episode Roll the Dice, and is revealed to be Cuphead's favorite song.

Published versions
 1868 version in Levy Sheet Music Collection
 July 11, 1874 broadside
 Rise Up Singing page 80

References

American songs
Songs about occupations
1867 songs
Songs with lyrics by George Leybourne
Eddie Cantor songs